Kemp Mill is a census-designated place and an unincorporated census area in Montgomery County, Maryland, United States. The population was 13,378 at the 2020 census.

Kemp Mill census area consists of the separate communities of Kemp Mill Estates and Kemp Mill Farms.

History
Kemp Mill was first developed in the 1950s as an exclusively white community. The neighborhood was among several communities in Montgomery County's Silver Spring area that were built by Jewish real estate developers catering to Jews moving to the suburbs from Washington, D.C. The majority of residences in Kemp Mill are single family homes dating to the 1950s, although newer homes were built in the 1980s and 1990s on Yeatman, Bromley, and Kersey roads. Kemp Mill Estates was developed by Jack Kay and Harold Greenberg of the Kay Construction Company, the son and son-in-law of real estate developer Abraham S. Kay. As with other neighborhoods in Silver Spring, racially restrictive covenants were used in Kemp Mill to exclude African-Americans prior to the passage of the 1968 Fair Housing Act.

By the 1970s, Kemp Mill was majority white but had begun to racially integrate. In the late 1970s, the average price of a home in Kemp Mill was between $85,000 and $90,000. In 1978, a black DC school official living in Kemp Mill was the target of a hate crime when the N-word and "KKK" were painted on her house and her tires were slashed.

In 1989, 25% of the 2,000 families in Kemp Mill were Orthodox Jews.

In September 1989, there was a spate of antisemitic incidents rumored to be due to "skinheads". Swastikas were painted on several vehicles, 40 cars had their windows shot in with BB guns, and the graffiti "All Jews Must Die Now" was painted on a sidewalk. These antisemitic incidents occurred a few months after a young Asian man was beaten in nearby Sligo Creek Park by a group of youths and young adults shouting anti-Asian racial slurs. A community meeting was held and the local police claimed that "youths" were to blame for the antisemitic incidents and that there were no organized neo-Nazis or skinheads in the region. However, a man living in Kemp Mill had recently been convicted for vandalism of the Kemp Mill Urban Park, an act the police claimed was inspired by the 1988 film Betrayed, which follows the actions of a white supremacist organization.

During the summer of 2020, multiple Black Lives Matter rallies were held at Northwood High School in Kemp Mill to protest against racism and police brutality.

In June 2022, shortly before the Shavuot holiday, antisemitic fliers advertising neo-Nazi websites were placed at several locations in Kemp Mill, including at a bus shelter located in front of the Young Israel Shomrai Emunah synagogue and on an ice chest outside of the Shalom Kosher grocery store. One flier said "Love Your Race" while another flier used an antisemitic slur, denied the Holocaust, and called for genocide.

Geography
As an unincorporated area, Kemp Mill does not have officially defined boundaries. However, Kemp Mill is recognized by the United States Census Bureau as a census-designated place, and by the United States Geological Survey as a populated place located at  (39.033832, −77.024541).

According to the United States Census Bureau, the neighborhood has a total area of 2.54 square miles (6.2 km2), all land.

Kemp Mill is considered by many of its residents, particularly those members of the Orthodox Jewish community, to be part of unincorporated Silver Spring. It is served by the Wheaton Post Office.

Culture
Kemp Mill is home to the largest Orthodox Jewish community on the East Coast between Baltimore and Miami. Kemp Mill hosts a number of synagogues serving Orthodox Jews (Modern Orthodox, Hasidic, and Yeshivish) including Young Israel Shomrai Emunah, Silver Spring Jewish Center, Kemp Mill Synagogue, the Yeshiva of Greater Washington, Chabad of Silver Spring, Kehillas Ohr Hatorah and Minchas Yitzhak.  Additionally, there are many smaller Orthodox Jewish minyanim (prayer groups) throughout the neighborhood including a Sephardic Minyan that meets at Shomrai Emunah and the Lower Lamberton Minyan. There are also many in the area who are served by Conservative synagogues, such as Har Tzeon Agudath Achim, and other branches of Judaism. Several Jewish and Catholic parochial schools are also located there including the boys division of the Yeshiva of Greater Washington, Silver Spring Learning Center, and the Jewish Montessori School. Two public schools are also situated in the area, including Kemp Mill Elementary and Odessa Shannon Middle School (Renamed from  Colonel E. Brooke Lee Middle School in July 2021). The former Spring Mill Elementary school is now an administrative office.

The Maryland-National Capital Park and Planning Commission's Kemp Mill Recreation Center offers users a baseball diamond, basketball and tennis courts, a meeting space, and a playground. Sligo Creek rises in Kemp Mill, and the hiker-biker trail that runs alongside the creek from Wheaton Regional Park to the Anacostia River passes through the community. The eastern end of Kemp Mill is bounded by the Northwest Branch, which also flows south to the Anacostia. Deer are a frequent sight in the neighborhood.

Kemp Mill Urban Park, centrally located on Arcola Avenue, has long served as a popular meeting place and playground. The park was closed in February 2016 for renovations and reopened in May 2017.

A Kemp Mill Village is being formed to serve the needs of elderly and disabled residents. Montgomery County has established the position of Village Coordinator to assist communities with establishing villages.

Commerce
Kemp Mill Shopping Center is the commerce hub of the neighborhood.

The Giant Food grocery store that anchored the Kemp Mill Shopping Center for decades closed on September 27, 2007. Magruder's, a small local chain of grocery stores, renovated the former Giant and opened on November 7, 2007, and closed in July, 2012. In July 2012, Shalom Kosher, which formerly had a kosher store in Wheaton, purchased Magruder's. On October 31, 2012, Shalom Kosher opened at 1361 Lamberton Drive.

Two private swimming pools, Parkland Pool and Kemp Mill Swim Club, serve the community.

Transportation
Kemp Mill is serviced by Ride On bus numbers 8, 9 and during rush hours, number 31, as well as Metrobus numbers C2 and C4. Washington Metro service on the Red Line is also available in nearby Wheaton and Silver Spring.

Education
Montgomery County Public Schools operates public schools.

Kemp Mill Elementary, Odessa Shannon Middle School and Northwood High School are all within the Kemp Mill CDP.

Demographics

As of the 2010 United States Census, there were 12,564 people and 4,430 households residing in the area. The racial makeup of the area was 61.7% White, 19.5% African American, 1% Native American, 5% Asian, 0.1% Pacific Islander, and 3.7% of mixed race. Hispanics and Latinos of any race were 18.6% of the population. Non-Hispanic whites were 54.8% of the population.

There were 3,386 households, out of which 33.9% had children under the age of 18 living with them, 65.3% were married couples living together, 9.6% had a female householder with no husband present, and 21.6% were non-families. 17.0% of all households were made up of individuals, and 8.7% had someone living alone who was 65 years of age or older. The average household size was 2.89 and the average family size was 3.22. Twenty-seven percent of Kemp Mill residents hold a graduate degree.

In the area, the population was spread out, with 25.1% under the age of 18, 5.6% from 18 to 24, 25.9% from 25 to 44, 24.7% from 45 to 64, and 18.7% who were 65 years of age or older. The median age was 41 years. For every 100 females, there were 95.6 males. For every 100 females age 18 and over, there were 91.5 males.

The median income for a household in the CDP was $89,294, and the median income for a family was $111,985. Males had a median income of $52,244 versus $41,285 for females. The per capita income for the area was $34,570. About 2.3% of families and 4.1% of the population were below the poverty line, including 2.6% of those under age 18 and 1.7% of those age 65 or over.

A large number of Russian-Jewish immigrants have settled in Kemp Mill, particularly since the 1980s. Due to the large Ethiopian and Jewish populations in Silver Spring and Washington, D.C., Kemp Mill is home to a sizeable community of Beta Israel (Ethiopian Jews).

References

External links

 Kemp Mill Civic Association

 
Ashkenazi Jewish culture in Maryland
Census-designated places in Maryland
Census-designated places in Montgomery County, Maryland
Ethiopian-Jewish culture in the United States
Haredi Judaism in the United States
Hasidic Judaism in the United States
Israeli-American history
Modern Orthodox Judaism in Maryland
Neighborhoods in Montgomery County, Maryland
Orthodox Jewish communities
Orthodox Judaism in Maryland
Russian-Jewish culture in Maryland
Sephardi Jewish culture in Maryland
Wheaton, Maryland
Yiddish culture in Maryland